Baysgarth House Museum is a local museum located in Baysgarth House, situated in Baysgarth Park, in the market town of Barton-upon-Humber, Lincolnshire, England.

Baysgarth House
Baysgarth House is a Grade II* listed building, believed to date from c. 1731. The building is built on an L-plan, with 2 storeys and an attic in red brick with a hipped pantiled roof. The building has an adjacent grade II listed stable building, believed to date from the early 19th Century, and an adjacent cottage believed to have been built for servants. Also attached to the property are the grade II* listed gate piers in an 18th-century style, topped by a lion and a unicorn. The two lodges in the wall date from the 19th Century.

The first known owner of Baysgarth House is Thomas Glentham. The Nelthorpes owned the house between 1620 and 1792. It passed through various owners until 1889 when it was sold to Robert Wright Taylor. Taylor and his wife Clara Lousia Taylor had two children in the house. After the son, George Robert Marmaduke Stanbury Taylor, died in the Battle of Ypres, their daughter Clare Ermyntrude Magdalen Wight Ramsden subsequently married and left the area leaving the house to the public in 1930. A memorial to Robert Wright, Clara Louisa, and George Robert was unveiled at the site by Clare Ramsden in July 1930 as part of the formal opening of the park and house to the public. The opening ceremony was attended by more than 3000 people.

During the Second World War and ARP Officer used the house. From 1960-1997 it was used by the local council. It opened as a museum in 1981.

As a museum
The main building houses Georgian and Victorian style rooms. The museum covers the lives of local people. There is a large collection of 18th and 19th century pottery and porcelain. There is also an Industrial Museum in the old stable block. Traditional crafts such as blacksmithing, cobbing, and thatching are displayed in the Craft Cottage. From 1930, it was in public ownership, until 2004 when the Community Heritage Arts and Media Project (Champ Ltd) took over the management of the house, including its additional buildings, museum, collections, and archives.

The museum is mainly staffed by volunteers who are responsible for opening the museum to the public, running exhibitions and assisting in collections care.

See also
 List of museums in Lincolnshire

References

External links
 Baysgarth House Museum home page
 Friends of Baysgarth House Museum home page
  Baysgarth House Museum Facebook Page

Country houses in Lincolnshire
Local museums in Lincolnshire
Museums established in 1981
1981 establishments in England
Grade II listed buildings in North Lincolnshire
Barton-upon-Humber